The 2006 West Oxfordshire District Council election took place on 4 May 2006 to elect members of West Oxfordshire District Council in Oxfordshire, England. One third of the council was up for election and the Conservative Party stayed in overall control of the council.

After the election, the composition of the council was:
Conservative 34
Liberal Democrats 9
Independent 5
Labour 1

Background
After the last election in 2004 the Conservatives controlled the council with 29 councillors, while the Liberal Democrats had 13 seats, Independents had six and the Labour Party had one seat. However, in April 2005 Conservative councillor Peter Green resigned from the party to sit as an independent, meaning that going into the 2006 election the Conservatives had 28 seats and there were 7 independents.

For the 16 seats contested in 2006, the Conservatives had 16 candidates, Labour 13, Liberal Democrats 11, Green Party 7 and there were 3 Independents.

Election result
The Conservatives increased their majority on the council after gaining six seats to take 14 of the 16 seats contested. This took the Conservatives to 34 councillors and came at the expense of the Liberal Democrats, who lost four seats, and the independents who lost two seats. The Liberal Democrats were therefore reduced to nine councillors and the independents to five, while Labour remained with a single councillor. Of the 10 councillors who sought re-election, nine were successful, with only Liberal Democrat Julian Cooper losing in Woodstock and Bladon ward by 34 votes to Conservative candidate Jill Dunsmore. Overall turnout at the election was 40.25%.

Ward results

By-elections between 2006 and 2007
A by-election was held in Witney Central on 25 January 2007 after the disappearance of Conservative councillor Andrew Creery. The seat was held for Conservatives by Colin Adams with a majority of 210 votes over Liberal Democrat Brenda Churchill.

References

2006 English local elections
2006
2000s in Oxfordshire